The Battle of Punk Hill was a relatively minor skirmish in the greater Forage War of the American Revolutionary War, but it narrowly missed being a major turning point.

Approximately 3000 British regulars left Amboy for the Punk Hill area, ostensibly on a foraging expedition. General William Maxwell observed this movement from a nearby hill and sent a small detachment to harass the British on the left and sent a larger force to the right towards Bonhamtown, hoping to outflank them. The larger force consisted of two detachments, one from Col. Potter's Pennsylvania militia and commanded by Col. Cook. the other detachment was from Col. Thacher's New England troops.

Cook's and Thacher's men joined forces approximately one half mile out and almost immediately encountered and engaged a substantial advanced party of British. General Maxwell sent Col. Martin and Lt. Col. Lindley to reinforce them quickly and began to assembling his main force to follow.

The British also sent reinforcements but they were cut off by another regiment of Americans. That British reinforcements retreated in confusion, sparking a general panic among their comrades and turning the entire engagement into a rout. The Americans chased them as far as Bonhamtown and Metuchen, but did not have sufficient numbers or cover to continue the pursuit.

There were at least four British killed and three taken prisoner. One of the prisoners revealed that General Howe had been at Bonhamtown during the engagement. Had Maxwell known this beforehand, the Battle of Punk Hill could have been a pivotal moment in the war.

References

1777 in New Jersey
Conflicts in 1777
Battles involving the United States
Battles involving Great Britain
Edison, New Jersey
Punk Hill